Municipal elections were held in the city of Montreal, Quebec, Canada on November 7, 2021, as part of the 2021 Quebec municipal elections. Voters elected 103 representatives in a first-past-the-post electoral system. The general election decides the majority composition of the city council and each of the 19 borough councils. The newly elected mayor appoints 2 city councillors for the Ville-Marie borough.
In total, 18 borough mayors, 46 city councillors and 38 borough councillors were elected.

Since the previous election, the number of registered political parties has increased, including a number of borough-specific parties.

Political parties

Timeline

2017
November 20 - Jean-François Parenteau, borough mayor of Verdun, leaves Équipe Denis Coderre to sit as an independent, upon taking a position on the executive council.

2018
January 11 - Équipe Denis Coderre pour Montréal takes on the name Ensemble Montréal.
April 26 - Hadrien Parizeau, city councillor for the district of Saint-Sulpice, is expelled from Ensemble Montréal and sits as an independent.
August 3 - Giuliana Fumagalli, borough mayor of Villeray–Saint-Michel–Parc-Extension, is expelled from Projet Montréal and sits as an independent.
August 17 - Renée-Chantal Belinga, borough councillor for the district of Ovide-Clermont, leaves Ensemble Montréal and sits as an independent.
October 1 - Chantal Rouleau, borough mayor of Rivière-des-Prairies–Pointe-aux-Trembles, and Frantz Benjamin, city councillor for the district of Saint-Michel, leave the city council upon being elected to the National Assembly of Quebec.
October 12 - Giovanni Rapanà, city councillor for the district of Rivière-des-Prairies, leaves Ensemble Montréal to sit as an independent.
October 20 - Marie-Josée Parent, city councillor for the district of Champlain–L'Île-des-Sœurs, leaves Ensemble Montréal to join Projet Montréal.
December 16 - In two by-elections, Caroline Bourgeois of Projet Montréal is elected borough mayor of Rivière-des-Prairies–Pointe-aux-Trembles, and Josué Corvil of Ensemble Montréal is elected city councillor for Saint-Michel.

2019
January 11 - Marvin Rotrand, city councillor for Snowdon, the only member of Coalition Montréal on the council, announces that he will sit as an independent.
March 27 - Lynne Shand, borough councillor for the district of Anjou West, is expelled from Équipe Anjou and sits as an independent.
April 9 - Cathy Wong, speaker of the city council and city councillor for the district of Peter-McGill, leaves Ensemble Montréal and sits as an independent.
May 14 - Luc Ferrandez, borough mayor of Le Plateau-Mont-Royal, resigns.
October 3 - Cathy Wong, speaker of the city council and city councillor for the district of Peter-McGill, sitting as an independent, joins Projet Montréal.
October 7 - Luc Rabouin of Projet Montréal is elected in a by-election to serve as borough mayor of Le Plateau-Mont-Royal, succeeding Luc Ferrandez.
October 21 - Patricia Lattanzio, city councillor for the district of Saint-Léonard-Est, leaves the city council upon being elected to the House of Commons of Canada.

2020
January 24 - Sue Montgomery, borough mayor of Côte-des-Neiges—Notre-Dame-de-Grâce, is expelled from the Projet Montréal caucus after refusing to fire a member of her staff that had been accused of psychological harassment. She sits as an independent.
October 23 - Julie-Pascale Provost, borough councillor for the district of Du Canal, is expelled from Projet Montréal and sits as an independent.
December 9 - Christian Arseneault, city councillor for the district of Loyola, leaves Projet Montréal and sits as an independent.
December 17 - Christine Gosselin, city councillor for the district of Vieux-Rosemont, leaves Projet Montréal and sits as an independent.

2021

 January 26 - Giuliana Fumagalli, borough mayor of Villeray–Saint-Michel–Parc-Extension, sitting as an independent, creates a new party, Quartiers Montréal.
March 11 - Sue Montgomery, borough mayor of Côte-des-Neiges—Notre-Dame-de-Grâce, sitting as an independent, creates a new party, Courage - Équipe Sue Montgomery.
March 17 - Jean-Marc Corbeil, borough councillor for the district of Robert-Bourassa, is expelled from Ensemble Montréal and sits as an independent.
April 21 - Hadrien Parizeau, city councillor for the district of Saint-Sulpice, sitting as an independent, rejoins Ensemble Montréal.
June 4 - Julie-Pascale Provost, borough councillor for the district of Du Canal, sitting as an independent, joins Ensemble Montréal.
June 16 - Marvin Rotrand, city councillor for the district of Snowdon, sitting as an independent, joins Ensemble Montréal.
June 18 - Giovanni Rapanà, city councillor for the district of Rivière-des-Prairies, sitting as an independent, rejoins Ensemble Montréal.
June 23 - Citoyen.ne.s Outremont allies with Ensemble Montréal.
July 12 - Équité Montréal allies with Ralliement pour Montréal.
July 13 - Véronique Tremblay, borough councillor for the district of Champlain–L'Île-des-Sœurs, leaves Ensemble Montréal to join Projet Montréal.
August 10 - Robert Samoszewski, borough councillor for the district of Jacques-Bizard, leaves Projet Montréal to join Mouvement Montréal.
August 16 - Christian Arseneault, city councillor for the district of Loyola, announces his resignation.
September 14 - Équipe Anjou allies with Ensemble Montréal.
September 17 - Official beginning of the electoral campaign
September 30 - Ralliement pour Montréal merges with Mouvement Montréal.
October 1 - Last day of the nomination period: 347 candidates are confirmed by Élections Montréal.
October 4 - Outremont borough councillor candidate Katchik Ebruchumian withdraws candidacy.
October 13 - Verdun borough councillor candidate Jean-Pierre Boivin leaves Mouvement Montréal.
October 15 - Rosemont–La Petite-Patrie city councillor candidate Marc-André Bahl and Verdun borough councillor candidate Jean-Pierre Boivin are expelled from Mouvement Montréal and lose candidacies.
October 19 - Marc-Antoine Desjardins, leader of Ralliement pour Montréal, announces dropping out of the race for Outremont mayor.
October 23 - Mercier–Hochelaga-Maisonneuve city councillor candidates Jean-Philippe Martin and Sylvain Medzalabenleth withdraw candidacies.
October 23 - French mayoral debate opposing Valérie Plante, Denis Coderre and Balarama Holness on LCN
October 25 - French mayoral debate opposing Valérie Plante and Denis Coderre on ICI Télé and ICI RDI
October 26 - Outremont borough councillor candidate Dan Kraft withdraws candidacy.
October 28 - English mayoral debate opposing Valérie Plante, Denis Coderre and Balarama Holness
October 30 and 31 - Advance poll with a turnout of 12.9% of the registered electors
November 4 - Craig Sauvé, city councillor for the district of Saint-Henri-Est–Petite-Bourgogne–Pointe-Saint-Charles–Griffintown, withdraws as a Projet Montréal candidate. His party affiliation continues to be listed on the ballot as Projet Montréal but he announces that if elected he will sit as an independent.

Incumbents not running for re-election

Mayoral opinion polling

Results

Much as with the 2017 Montreal municipal election, early polls were promising for former mayor Denis Coderre, now challenging incumbent mayor Valérie Plante. Despite these, and despite ongoing polling placing the two neck-and-neck, Plante ultimately won the mayoralty with 51.2% of the vote compared to 37.3% for Coderre.

Pending recounts, Projet Montréal also increased its seat total on city council from 34 after the last election to 37 after this one. Projet Montréal won unanimous control of five borough councils and majorities on six more. Ensemble Montréal won unanimous control of five borough councils and majorities on one more. The two remaining boroughs, Anjou and LaSalle, were won unanimously by local parties, Équipe Anjou and Équipe LaSalle Team respectively, the same as last election.

Following his defeat, Denis Coderre announced he would once more resign from political life, leaving his city council seat to his co-candidate Chantal Rossi. On November 16, Aref Salem, councillor for Norman-McLaren district, was announced as interim leader of Ensemble Montréal.

Despite a prominent campaign, Balarama Holness's Mouvement Montréal party failed to win any seats.

Recounts

There were six requests for judicial recounts.

Seat totals

The parties won the following seats:

Composition of city and borough councils

Depending on their borough, Montrealers voted for:
 
 Mayor of Montreal
 Borough mayor, who is also a city councillor and borough councillor 
 Ville-Marie: No borough mayor election; the mayor of Montreal is ex officio borough mayor
 One city councillor per district, who is also a borough councillor. Exceptions:
 Anjou and Lachine: one city councillor for the entire borough
 Outremont and L'Île-Bizard–Sainte-Geneviève: no city councillors other than the borough mayor
 Zero, one, or two additional borough councillors per district

Seat-by-seat results

Mayoral election

Ahuntsic-Cartierville

Anjou

Côte-des-Neiges–Notre-Dame-de-Grâce

L'Île-Bizard–Sainte-Geneviève

Lachine

LaSalle

Mercier–Hochelaga-Maisonneuve

Montréal-Nord

Outremont

Pierrefonds-Roxboro

Le Plateau-Mont-Royal

Rivière-des-Prairies–Pointe-aux-Trembles

Rosemont–La Petite-Patrie

Saint-Laurent

Saint-Léonard

Le Sud-Ouest

Verdun

Ville-Marie

Villeray–Saint-Michel–Parc-Extension

References

Montreal
Municipal elections in Montreal